The Bakoruco least gecko (Sphaerodactylus cryphius) is a species of lizard in the family Sphaerodactylidae. It is endemic to the Dominican Republic.

References

Sphaerodactylus
Reptiles of the Dominican Republic
Endemic fauna of the Dominican Republic
Reptiles described in 1977
Taxa named by Albert Schwartz (zoologist)
Taxa named by Richard Thomas (herpetologist)